Yuriy Yaroslavovych Furta (born 30 August 1988) is a Ukrainian professional football striker who currently plays on loan for Ukrainian First League club FC Arsenal Bila Tserkva. He is the product of the Karpaty Lviv Youth School System. Furta was promoted to the senior team at the beginning of the 2008–09, however he continues to play for the reserves as well.

Career

Oleksandria
He transferred on loan to PFC Oleksandria in 2010.

Desna Chernihiv
In 2012 he moved to Desna Chernihiv, the main club in Chernihiv, here he won with the club the Ukrainian Second League in season 2012–13.

Sambir & Karpaty Lviv
In 2020 he moved from Sambir to Karpaty Lviv in Ukrainian Second League.

Honours
FC Desna Chernihiv
 Ukrainian Second League: 2012–13

Individual
 Ukrainian Premier League Reserves Top Scorer: 2009–10 (15 goals)

References

External links

Profile at fckarpaty.com
Profile at fckarpaty.lviv.ua
Profile at footballsquads.co.uk

 

1988 births
Living people
Sportspeople from Lviv
Ukrainian footballers
FC Karpaty Lviv players
FC Karpaty-2 Lviv players
FC Oleksandriya players
FC Arsenal-Kyivshchyna Bila Tserkva players
FC Enerhetyk Burshtyn players
FC Desna Chernihiv players
FC Rukh Lviv players
FC Sambir players
SCC Demnya players
Ukrainian Premier League players
Ukrainian First League players
Ukrainian Second League players
Ukrainian Amateur Football Championship players
Ukrainian expatriate footballers
Expatriate footballers in Poland
Ukrainian expatriate sportspeople in Poland
Association football forwards